Showing Up may refer to:

 Showing Up (film), 2022 American film
 Showing Up (horse), American race horse